Germinal is a 1963 French language French-Italian-Hungarian film directed by Yves Allégret. It is an adaptation of the 1885 novel Germinal by Emile Zola.

Plot 
The year is 1863. Étienne Lantier gets work as a mineworker after having been fired from his job on the railroad for revolutionary behavior. Disheartened by the conditions in the mines, he returns to his revolutionary ideas and leads a strike of the mineworkers. Soldiers are brought in to quell the strike.

Cast
 Jean Sorel as Étienne Lantier, a new young miner
 Berthe Granval as Catherine Maheu, a young woman
 Claude Brasseur as Marcel (or Martin) Chaval, a miner in love with Catherine
 Bernard Blier as Hennebeau, the owner of a mineshaft
 Claude Cerval as Victor Maigrat, a businessman
 Philippe Lemaire as Henri Negrel, an engineer
 Jacqueline Porel as Mme Maigrat
 Lea Padovani as La Maheude
 Pierre Destailles as Raseneur, an innkeeper
 Paulette Dubost as Rose, Hennebeau's servant
 Gabrielle Dorziat as Cécile's grandmother
 Simone Valère as Madame Clotilde Hennebeau
 Jacques Monod as Deneulin
 Michèle Cordoue as Désir, a widow
 Sándor Pécsi as Maheu, a miner
 Gábor Koncz as Souvarine, a revolutionary
 Marianne Krencsey as la Mouquette
 Zoltán Makláry as Bonnemort, an old miner
 René Lefèvre-Bel as Félix, Hennebeau's butler

See also
 Germinal (1913}
 Germinal (1993)

External links
 

1963 films
1960s historical films
French historical films
1960s French-language films
Films directed by Yves Allégret
French drama films
Films based on works by Émile Zola
Films set in 1863
Films about mining
Films about the labor movement
1960s French films